Mouloudia Club d'Alger, referred to as MC Alger or MCA for short, is an Algerian handball team that was founded on 1964, it is also considered as the most titled handball club in africa(90 titles), as a division of the of MC Alger. They play their home games in Hacène Harcha Arena, which has a capacity of 8,000 people.

History

From 2008 to 2020, the team was known as GS Pétroliers as it was part of the multi-sports club with that name.

The team's name changed back to MC Alger in 2020.

Honours

National titles 
 Algerian Handball Championship
Winners (28; record): 1982, 1984, 1987, 1988, 1989, 1991, 1992, 1994, 1995, 1997, 1998, 1999, 2000, 2001, 2002, 2003, 2005, 2006, 2007, 2008, 2009, 2010, 2011, 2013, 2014, 2016, 2017, 2018
 Algerian Handball Cup
Winners (30; record): 1982, 1983, 1987, 1989, 1990, 1991, 1993, 1994, 1995, 1997, 1998, 1999, 2000, 2001, 2002, 2003, 2004, 2005, 2006, 2007, 2008, 2009, 2010, 2011, 2012, 2013, 2014, 2017, 2019, 2022
 Algerian Handball Supercup
Winners (2; record): 2016, 2018

International titles (handball) 
 African Handball Champions League
Winners (11): 1983, 1997, 1998, 1999, 2000, 2003, 2004, 2005, 2006, 2008, 2009
Runner-ups (2): 1985, 2010
 African Handball Cup Winners' Cup
Winners (9; record): 1988, 1991, 1992, 1993, 1994, 1995, 1997, 1998, 1999
Runner-up (3): 1989, 1990, 1996
 African Handball Super Cup
Winners (9; record): 1994, 1995, 1996, 1997, 1998, 1999, 2004, 2005, 2006
Runner-up (1): 2010
 Arab Club Handball Championship
Winners (2): 1989, 1991
Runner-up (1): 1993
 IHF Super Globe
Seven Place : 1997
Third place : 2007

 Double
 Winners (21): 1981–82, 1986–87, 1988–89, 1989–90, 1990–91, 1993–94, 1994–95, 1996–97, 1997–98, 1998–99, 1999–00, 2002–03, 2004–05, 2005–06, 2007–08, 2008–09, 2009–10, 2010–11, 2012–13, 2013–14, 2016–17    
 Triple Crown
 Winners (9): 1996–97, 1997–98, 1998–99, 1999–00, 2002–03, 2004–05, 2005–06, 2007–08, 2008–09

References

External links
Team's profile at kooora.com

Groupement Sportif des Pétroliers
Algerian handball clubs
Handball clubs established in 1964